San Rafael (Spanish for "St. Raphael") is a city and the county seat of Marin County, California, United States. The city is located in the North Bay region of the San Francisco Bay Area. As of the 2020 U.S. census, the city's population was 61,271, up from 57,713 in 2010.

San Rafael was founded by the Spanish in 1817, when Vicente Francisco de Sarría established Mission San Rafael Arcángel, initially as an asistencia (sub-mission). San Rafael Arcángel was upgraded to full mission status in 1822, a month before Alta California declared independence from Spain as part of Mexico. Following the American Conquest of California, the community of San Rafael incorporated as a city in 1874.

History
San Rafael was once the site of several Coast Miwok villages: Awani-wi, near downtown San Rafael, Ewu, near Terra Linda and Shotomko-cha, in Marinwood.

Spanish period

Mission San Rafael Arcángel was founded as the 20th Spanish mission in the colonial province of Alta California by three priests—Father Narciso Durán from Mission San José, Father Abella from Mission San Francisco de Asís, Father Luis Gíl y Taboada from La Iglesia de Nuestra Señora Reina de los Angeles—on Dec. 14, 1817, four years before Mexico gained independence from Spain. The mission from which the downtown grew and the city are named after the Archangel Raphael, the Angel of Healing.

The mission was originally planned as a hospital site for Central Valley American Indians who had become ill at the cold San Francisco Mission Dolores. Father Luis Gil, who spoke several Native American languages, was put in charge of the facility. In part because of its ideal weather, San Rafael was later upgraded to full mission status in 1822.

Mexican period

The mission had 300 converts within its first year, and 1,140 converts by 1828.

Following the Mexican secularization act of 1833, the Mexican government took over the California missions in 1834, and Mission San Rafael was abandoned in 1844, eventually falling into ruin.

American period
The San Francisco and North Pacific Railroad reached San Rafael in 1879 and was linked to the national rail network in 1888. The United States Navy operated a San Pablo Bay degaussing range from San Rafael through World War II.

Geography

At certain locations such as Murphys Point, the sandstone or shale rock outcrops through the mud.

San Rafael has a wide diversity of natural habitats from forests at the higher elevations to marshland and estuarine settings. Its marshes are home to the endangered species salt marsh harvest mouse. There are also riparian areas including the San Rafael Creek and Miller Creek corridors.

Climate

San Rafael has a warm-summer Mediterranean climate (Köppen climate classification Csb), with mild winter lows seldom reaching the freezing mark. The highest temperature in recent years, occurred on July 23, 2006, and  again on September 6, 2020. Freezing temperatures ( or below) occur on an average of 3.6 mornings.

Total annual precipitation averages , with an average of 64.3 days with measurable rain. The rainy season is from November to early April: rain is rare outside of this period and it is normal to receive no rain in June, July, August, and September. A trace of snow was recorded on January 30, 1976.

Demographics

2010

The 2010 United States Census reported that the city of San Rafael had a population of 57,713. This figure does not, however, include portions of the Santa Venetia and Lucas Valley-Marinwood CDPs, nor various other unincorporated areas, all of which have San Rafael postal addresses; in total, according to the 2010 Census, there were 70,197 residents of San Rafael postal addresses (ZIP codes 94901 and 94903).

The following statistics refer to the incorporated limits of San Rafael only. The racial makeup of San Rafael was 40,734 (70.6%) White, 1,154 (2.0%) African American, 709 (1.2%) Native American, 3,513 (6.1%) Asian, 126 (0.2%) Pacific Islander, 8,513 (14.8%) from other races, and 2,964 (5.1%) from two or more races. Hispanic or Latino of any race were 17,302 persons (30.0%).

The Census reported that 55,594 people (96.3% of the population) lived in households, 1,314 (2.3%) lived in non-institutionalized group quarters, and 805 (1.4%) were institutionalized.

There were 22,764 households, out of which 6,358 (27.9%) had children under the age of 18 living in them, 9,845 (43.2%) were opposite-sex married couples living together, 2,004 (8.8%) had a female householder with no husband present, 1,133 (5.0%) had a male householder with no wife present. There were 1,450 (6.4%) unmarried opposite-sex partnerships, and 301 (1.3%) same-sex married couples or partnerships. 7,434 households (32.7%) were made up of individuals, and 2,954 (13.0%) had someone living alone who was 65 years of age or older. The average household size was 2.44. There were 12,982 families (57.0% of all households); the average family size was 3.02.

The population was spread out, with 11,132 people (19.3%) under the age of 18, 4,956 people (8.6%) aged 18 to 24, 16,915 people (29.3%) aged 25 to 44, 15,574 people (27.0%) aged 45 to 64, and 9,136 people (15.8%) who were 65 years of age or older. The median age was 40.2 years. For every 100 females, there were 99.7 males. For every 100 females age 18 and over, there were 98.1 males.

The homeowner vacancy rate was 1.6%; the rental vacancy rate was 5.1%. 27,554 people (47.7% of the population) lived in owner-occupied housing units and 28,040 people (48.6%) lived in rental housing units.

2000

As of the census of 2000, there were 56,063 people, 22,371 households, and 12,773 families residing in the city. The population density was 3,378.9 inhabitants per square mile (1,304.8/km2). The racial makeup of the city in 2010 was 59.0% non-Hispanic White, 1.8% non-Hispanic African American, 0.2% Native American, 6.0% Asian, 0.2% Pacific Islander, 0.3% from other races, and 2.6% from two or more races. 30.0% were Hispanic or Latino of any race.

There were 22,371 households, out of which 25.8% had children under the age of 18, 44.3% were married couples living together, 9.0% had a female householder with no husband present, and 42.9% were non-families. 32.1% of all households were made up of individuals, and 10.9% had someone living alone who was 65 or older. The average household size was 2.42 and the average family size was 2.99. The age distribution was as follows: 19.5% under the age of 18, 8.1% from 18 to 24, 33.3% from 25 to 44, 24.8% from 45 to 64, and 14.4% who were 65 years of age or older. The median age was 38 years. For every 100 females, there were 98.2 males. For every 100 females age 18 and over, there were 95.7 males.

The reported median income for a household in the city was $60,994; the median reported income for a family was $74,398 (these figures had risen to $67,789 and $85,459 respectively as of a 2007 estimate). Males reported a median income of $50,650 versus $39,912 for females. The reported per capita income for the city was $35,762. About 5.6% of families and 10.2% of the population reported incomes below the poverty line, including 11.7% of those under age 18 and 5.0% of those age 65 or over.

Economy

BioMarin, Autodesk, In Defense of Animals, Westamerica Bank, and GIS Data Resources are among the companies headquartered in San Rafael. In May 2022, Autodesk announced its intention to move its headquarters to San Francisco, along with its 578 employees, and close the San Rafael office by October of that year.

Housing 
San Rafael, a small city situated in Marin County, is known for its affluent suburban/urban environment. Despite the median income for a family in San Rafael reaching an estimated amount of $97,009 according to the 2016-2020 US Census report, different regions of San Rafael remain below the poverty line of 11.4%.

Top employers

According to San Rafael's 2010 Comprehensive Annual Financial Report, the top employers in the city are:

Entertainment industry

After the arrival of George Lucas in San Rafael in 1970 to film the movie THX 1138, the city became a center for the entertainment industry, particularly the high-tech elements of the business. Lucasfilm was founded by George Lucas in 1971, and is best known for the global hit movie series Star Wars and also for Indiana Jones. Some of the company's operations were moved to San Francisco in 2005. Portions of the Universal movie production American Graffiti were filmed in downtown San Rafael under George Lucas's direction, and portions of THX 1138 were shot at the Marin County Civic Center in San Rafael. Much of the movie Gattaca, starring Ethan Hawke, was also shot in the Marin County Civic Center. Industrial Light & Magic was founded in 1975 by Lucas to do special effects for his films and those of other filmmakers. The new-age music program Hearts of Space has been headquartered in San Rafael since 2004.

Largely because of the presence of LucasFilm, San Rafael started to attract video game developers, with several major studios located in the city:

 Broderbund — Founded by Doug Carlston and Gary Carlston in 1980, the company was sold to Mindscape in 1998 and moved to Novato. Best known for the hit titles Choplifter, Lode Runner, The Print Shop, Where in the World is Carmen Sandiego? and Myst, and for being the early distributor of SimCity. After several subsequent acquisitions by various companies, in 2001 the remaining Broderbund offices were moved to San Francisco.
 LucasArts — Founded by George Lucas in (1984) as LucasFilm Games; relocated to San Francisco in 2005. Best known for Star Wars and Indiana Jones games and innovative titles such as The Secret of Monkey Island, Grim Fandango and Full Throttle.
 Stormfront Studios — Founded by San Rafael native Don Daglow in 1988. Best known for The Lord of the Rings: The Two Towers, many EA Sports titles including NASCAR Racing, Gold Box role-playing video games and the first graphical MMORPG, Neverwinter Nights.
 Visual Concepts — Founded by Greg Thomas in 1988, the company was bought by Sega in 1999, then sold to Take Two Interactive in 2004. Best known for creating many EA Sports titles, and recently for Sega Sports and its 2K line of sports games.
 Totally Games — Founded by former LucasArts programmer Larry Holland in 1994. Best known for a series of Star Wars flight sim games.
THX — the high-fidelity audio/visual reproduction standard which started as a spin-off from Lucasfilm Ltd., founded by Tomlinson Holman at George Lucas's company.
 Factor 5 — Founded in Germany in 1987 by Julian Eggebrecht, moved to San Rafael in 1996 to be close to publisher LucasArts. Best known for Star Wars and Indiana Jones games. In May 2009, the company's San Rafael studio closed.
 Telltale Games — Founded in 2004 by former LucasArts employees. Best known for its video game adaptation of The Walking Dead and Sam & Max adventure games. The company filed for bankruptcy on November 14, 2018.
 Mind Control Software — Founded in 1994 by Andrew Leker, Best known for its Independent Games Festival–winning game, Oasis.

Parks

Community in San Rafael include Albert Park, Boyd Park, Gerstle Park, Pickleweed Park and the Terra Linda Recreational Center.

Notable large parks include China Camp State Park and McNear's Beach Park.

There are a number of neighborhood parks and mini-parks such as Bret Harte Park, Boyd Park, Sun Valley Park, Oleander Park, Victor Jones Park, Peacock Gap Park and Gerstle Park.

Gerstle Park is also a historic and walkable neighborhood south of First Street in close proximity to central Downtown.

Government

San Rafael is a stronghold of the Democratic Party. According to the California Secretary of State, as of February 10, 2019, San Rafael has 31,288 registered voters. Of those, 17,566 (56.1%) are registered Democrats, 4,292 (13.7%) are registered Republicans, and 8,121 (26%) have declined to state a political party.

San Rafael is governed by a city council with five members, four of which are elected by geographic district for four-year terms. Each Councilmember is required to live in the district they represent and are elected only by the registered voters of that district. The Mayor is elected at-large. The current members are:
 Mayor Kate Colin
 District 1 Councilmember: Maika Llorens Gulati
 District 2 Councilmember: Eli Hill
 District 3 Councilmember: Maribeth Bushey
 District 4 Councilmember: Rachel Kertz

Federal and state

From 2008 to 2012, Huffman represented Marin County in the California State Assembly.

In the California State Legislature, San Rafael is in:

Education

San Rafael has one university, Dominican University of California.

The Ali Akbar College of Music, was founded in San Rafael by Indian musician Ali Akbar Khan to teach Indian classical music. San Rafael is also the home to one of the two campuses of Guide Dogs for the Blind, a guide dog training school.

Most public schools in San Rafael are operated by the San Rafael City Schools district. Miller Creek Elementary School District operates some public elementary and middle schools north of San Rafael proper. All comprehensive public high schools are governed by San Rafael City Schools. The district operates two comprehensive public high schools: San Rafael High School, Terra Linda High School and one alternative high school, Madrone.

Notable private schools include Marin Academy, Saint Raphael School, Brandeis Marin, and The Marin School.

Transportation

The major north–south freeway through San Rafael is U.S. Route 101, connecting the North Coast (California) and the Redwood Empire to the north, and San Francisco to the south. Interstate 580 heads across the Richmond–San Rafael Bridge to the East Bay.

The San Rafael Transit Center, located at the corner of 3rd and Hetherton Streets, is served by a number of bus agencies, including Golden Gate Transit, Marin Transit, Sonoma County Transit, Sonoma County Airport Express, and Greyhound. Local bus service is provided primarily by Golden Gate Transit and Marin Transit.

Commuter rail by Sonoma–Marin Area Rail Transit (SMART) serves the city at two stations: a converted San Rafael Transit Center and a station at Marin Civic Center. The line to Santa Rosa and its Airport opened in 2017 bringing passenger rail to San Rafael for the first time since 1958. Until 1958, San Rafael was served by the Northwestern Pacific Railroad. The line from San Rafael was extended to Larkspur to make Larkspur Landing ferry connection in December 2019.

In popular culture
The term "420", as used in reference to cannabis consumption, originated in San Rafael. A group of students of the San Rafael High School class of 1975 known as the Waldos used "420" as a code for smoking marijuana at 4:20 p.m., after school.

Shel Silverstein's poem "The Smoke-Off" is about a girl named Pearly Sweetcakes who came from San Rafael.

The TV show 13 Reasons Why is based in San Rafael, and many scenes from the first season were filmed downtown.

Notable people

 Isabel Allende, author
 Dave Archer, artist
 Stacey Bailey, former American football wide receiver, Atlanta Falcons
 Elizabeth Charleston, painter
 Philip K. Dick, novelist
 George Duke, keyboardist, composer, singer-songwriter and record producer
 William English, contributed to the development of the computer mouse
 Justine Frischmann, lead singer of Elastica and visual artist
 Brad Gilbert, professional tennis player and coach
 Jared Goff, quarterback for the Detroit Lions
 Lauren Grandcolas, a 9/11 victim on United Flight 93
 Marc Diraison, voice actor
 Cynthia Harvey (born 1957), ballet dancer and educator
 Llewellyn F. Haskell (1842–1929), United States Army officer and a Union general during the American Civil War
 James Hetfield, musician, lead singer of Metallica
 Michael Johnson, sprinter, 1996 Atlanta Olympics gold medalist, resides in the hills above San Rafael
 Rick Kranitz former minor league pitcher for the Milwaukee Brewers and now the pitching coach for the Atlanta Braves
 Christian Mortensen (1882–1998), supercentenarian, the one-time oldest living human male, aged 115 years and 252 days at his death
 Gladys Kathleen Parkin, wireless radio operator
 Charles Dormon Robinson, painter
 Dana Sabraw, U.S. District Judge
 Marin Sais, actress
 Carlos Santana, musician
 Michael Savage, radio host, author, activist, nutritionist, conservative political commentator, host of The Savage Nation
 Scott Thunes, musician
 Natu Tuatagaloa, former professional football player in the NFL
 Will Venable, former professional Major League Baseball player

Sister cities
 San Rafael del Norte, Nicaragua
 Lonate Pozzolo, Province of Varese, Italy
 Falkirk, Scotland
 Chiang Mai, Thailand

References

Bibliography
 San Rafael Recreation Element of the General Plan, June, 1984
 U.S. Geological Survey, Topographical Map, San Quentin 7.5 Minute Quadrangle, revised 1980

External links

San Rafael Chamber of Commerce
Marin History Museum

 
1874 establishments in California
Cities in Marin County, California
Cities in the San Francisco Bay Area
County seats in California
Incorporated cities and towns in California
Populated places established in 1874
Spanish mission settlements in North America
Populated coastal places in California